Bhumidhar Barman (12 October 1931 – 18 April 2021) was an Indian Politician belonging to the Indian National Congress. He was the Chief Minister of Assam from 22 April 1996 to 14 May 1996. He was a member of the Assam Legislative Assembly being elected 7 times. He was first elected in 1967. In 2015, he was made a Cabinet Minister of Assam.

Early life and education 

Bhumidhar Barman was born on 12 October 1931 to the late Bhakat Ram Barman and the late Mathupriya Barman in Belsor. He passed his matriculation from Tihu High School in 1951. His Father, Late Bhakat Ram Barman was a well established businessman of his area. He completed his schooling Tihu High school, thereafter at Cotton Collage and finally his MBBS degree from Assam Medical Collage. He was among the last batch of students to have passed out from Calcutta University. Initially he started practising nearby his village people who were deprived of the medical facility and soon became famous as Bhumi Doctor.

Political career 

He joined Indian National Congress in 1967 and got elected from then west Nalbari constituency and again in 1972. He again was elected in 1983 but for Dharmapur. After Hiteshwar Saikia's death he was made Chief Minister. He was again elected to the Assembly in 1991 for Barkherty and again in 2001 until 2016. Barman was made a minister many times throughout his career. Barman was the oldest member in the council of ministers of Assam in 2010. He was made acting Chief Minister when Tarun Gogoi was hospitalised in Mumbai for heart surgery.

Personal life 
Barman married Malati Barman and they had 1 son and 3 daughters. His daughters are Dipali Barman, Reena Barman Kalita and Rita Barman Hazarika. His son Diganta Barman contested for the Barkherty seat in 2016 but lost. However he won in 2021.

Death 
Barman had been admitted to Dispur Hospital on March 13. He had been suffering for chronic kidney disease and other heart issues. He was put into the ICU under ventilation. Senior congress leaders such as Rispun Bora visited him.

Barman died at 6:23 pm 18 April 2021. Many politicians such as Narendra Modi, Venkaiah Naidu, Sarbananda Sonowal, Himanta Biswa Sarma, Ripun Bora, Keshab Mahanta,  Debabrata Saikia, Lurinjyoti Gogoi, Chandra Mohan Patowary, Jitendra Singh, Abdul Khalque, Pradyut Bordoloi, Bhupen Kumar Borah, Badruddin Ajmal, Raijor Dal all paid tribute.

The State Government declared a three-day state mourning period where the national flag was flown half-mast in all offices where it was flown regularly and no official entertainment was held.

Assam police gave a 21-gun salute to the Congress stalwart at the funeral which was attended by Sarbananda Sonowal, Ranjeet Kumar Dass, Ripun Bora, Barman's son Diganta and other politicians. Diganta performed his last rites with all family members present. The body of Barman was brought to his village in a vehicle decorated with flowers.  Before bringing the body to his native village, Barman's body was taken to Assam Legislative Assembly where  Cabinet minister Chandra Mohan Patowary, Chief Secretary Jishnu Barua and DGP Bhaskar Jyoti Mahanta paid tributes to Barman.  His body was next taken to the congress headquarters, Nalbari deputy commissioner's office and Rajiv Bhawan where people paid tribute to the Chief minister.

References 

Chief Ministers of Assam
Indian National Congress politicians from Assam
1931 births
2021 deaths
Politicians from Guwahati
People from Nalbari
Chief ministers from Indian National Congress
State cabinet ministers of Assam
Assam MLAs 1967–1972
Assam MLAs 1972–1978
Assam MLAs 1983–1985
Assam MLAs 1991–1996
Assam MLAs 2001–2006
Assam MLAs 2006–2011
Assam MLAs 2011–2016